William Sumner may refer to:

 William Graham Sumner (1840–1910), American professor of sociology
 William H. Sumner (1780–1861), American politician in Massachusetts
 William Keolaloa Sumner (1816–1885), Hawaiian chief